Kogorō, Kogoro or Kogorou (written: 小五郎) is a masculine Japanese given name. Notable people with the name include:

 (1894–1978), Japanese businessman
 (1854–1926), Japanese diplomat and ambassador

Fictional characters:
, fictional amateur detective created by Edogawa Rampo
, fictional private detective from the Japanese detective manga and anime series, Case Closed written and illustrated by Gosho Aoyama

Japanese masculine given names